The 1995 Waldbaum's Hamlet Cup was a men's tennis tournament played on Hard courts in Long Island, United that was part of the International Series of the 1995 ATP Tour. It was the fifteenth edition of the tournament and was held from August 21 through August 27, 1995. First-seeded Yevgeny Kafelnikov won the singles title.

Finals

Singles

 Yevgeny Kafelnikov defeated  Jan Siemerink, 7–6(7–0), 6–2
 It was Kafelnikov's 4th singles title of the year and the 7th of his career.

Doubles

 Cyril Suk /  Daniel Vacek defeated  Rick Leach /  Scott Melville, 5–7, 7–6, 7–6

References

External links
 ITF tournament edition details

Waldbaum's Hamlet Cup
1995
Waldbasums